Khao kha mu (pinyin: zhū jiǎo fàn), or sometimes simply called kha mu, is a popular Thai food. It is influenced by Chinese cuisine, specifically Teochew cuisine.

Khao kha mu is an individual dish consisting of stewed pig's trotter in seasoning condensed hot pottage (some recipes are mixed with cocoa powder or boiled peanuts ), then it will be cut into thin slices and topped on steamed rice. The dish is served with half spiced corned eggs, small pieces of pickled mustard greens and occasionally blanched chinese broccoli with fresh bird's eye chili peppers and cloves of garlic on the side. Sometimes it is eaten with clear broth soup. The accompanying dipping sauce is most often made of yellow chili peppers, garlics, granulated salt, limeade and vinegar.

Khao kha mu is a food that can be found online from street stalls, food courts in department stores to the luxury restaurants.

For Bangkok, there are many famous khao kha mu restaurants in various neighbourhoods such as Bang Wa, Phlapphla Chai, Mo Mi, Sam Yan, etc. Some restaurant in Bang Rak received Bib Gourmand awards twice in both 2018 and 2019 Michelin Guide.

References

Pork dishes
Street food
Chinese-Thai culture
Thai rice dishes
Chinese cuisine outside China